The 2014 Skate Canada International was the second event of six in the 2014–15 ISU Grand Prix of Figure Skating, a senior-level international invitational competition series. It was held at the Prospera Place in Kelowna, British Columbia on October 31 – November 2. Medals were awarded in the disciplines of men's singles, ladies' singles, pair skating, and ice dancing. Skaters earned points toward qualifying for the 2014–15 Grand Prix Final.

Entries

Changes to preliminary assignments
 On July 10, Felicia Zhang and Nathan Bartholomay were removed from the roster. On July 15, Madeline Aaron / Max Settlage were named as replacements. On July 16, it was revealed that Zhang/Bartholomay had split up.
 On August 4, Alaine Chartrand was added as a host pick.
 On September 9, Valentina Marchei was removed from the roster due to an injury. On September 17, she was replaced by Viktoria Helgesson.
 On September 16, Kaetlyn Osmond withdrew due to injury. On September 17, she was replaced by Julianne Séguin.
 On September 23, Alexander Majorov was removed from the roster. No reason has been given. On October 1st, Zhan Bush was announced as his replacement.
 On October 16, Zhan Bush was removed from the roster due to health problems. On October 21, Stephen Carriere was announced as his replacement.
 On October 17, Nathalie Weinzierl was removed from the roster. No reason has been given. On October 22, Brooklee Han was announced as her replacement.
 On October 27, Kevin Reynolds withdrew due to an injury. He was replaced by Andrei Rogozine.
 On October 30, Elladj Balde was removed from the roster due to a concussion. He was not replaced.

Results

Men

Ladies

Pairs

Ice dancing

References

External links
 2014 Skate Canada at the International Skating Union
 Starting orders and result details

Skate Canada International, 2014
Skate Canada International
Skate Canada International 
Skate Canada International
Skate Canada International
Skate Canada International